Events in the year 2020 in the Gambia.

Incumbents

President: Adama Barrow 

Vice-President of the Gambia: Isatou Touray

Chief Justice: Hassan Bubacar Jallow

Events

17 March – First confirmed case of COVID-19 in the Gambia

Deaths

 24 January - Demba Sowe, politician, member of the national assembly (b. 1972)
 4 April - Ousman B. Conateh, sports executives and administrators (b. 1937)
 9 June - Ebrima „Mbat“ Jobe, national basketballplayer (b. ≈ 1950)
 28 June – Louis Mahoney, Gambian-born British actor (b. 1938).
 19 July – Biri Biri, footballer (b. 1948).

See also
COVID-19 pandemic in the Gambia

References

 
2020s in the Gambia 
Years of the 21st century in the Gambia 
Gambia 
Gambia